Chersonesia is an Indomalayan butterfly genus in the family Nymphalidae. The common name is maplet.

Species
Chersonesia excellens (Martin, 1903)
Chersonesia intermedia Martin, 1895
Chersonesia nicevillei Martin, 1895
Chersonesia peraka Distant, 1884
Chersonesia rahria (Moore, [1858])
Chersonesia rahrioides Moore, [1899]
Chersonesia risa (Doubleday, [1848])

References

Cyrestinae
Nymphalidae genera
Taxa named by William Lucas Distant